TC Works Spark was a 2-track audio editing application for the Mac OS 9 and Mac OS X, developed by TC Works, the former computer recording subsidiary of TC Electronic, from 1999 to 2003. Spark was discontinued in 2003.

Features
2 track audio editing.
CD burning.
Audio processing with included or third party VST or AU plug-ins.
Audio analysis tools.
Batch conversion.
Noise reduction tools.

Variants
Spark was available in these versions:
Spark ME - a free version available for download from the TC Works website.
Spark LE - a version bundled with early TC PowerCore cards.
Spark LE Plus - a version only available for purchase from the TC webshop
Spark XL - the flagship application, bundled with several audio plug-ins.
Spark - the predecessor to Spark XL.
Spark Modular - a collection of software modules for building your own modular synthesizer.
Spark FX Machine - a matrix similar to the one found in the TC Electronic FireworX hardware unit.

References

Classic Mac OS software
Audio editors